C.L.G. Den Haag is the most successful GAA club in the Netherlands. They are also continental Europe's most successful Gaelic football club, having won the European Gaelic Football Championship four times and having finished runner-up in 2011.

Each year the club hosts an 11 a-side European Invitational Gaelic Football Tournament.

They also do hurling. Declan Bonner from Donegal was awarded the 2009 Den Haag Hurler of the Year.

See also
 List of Gaelic games clubs outside Ireland

References

External links
 Official website

Gaelic football clubs in Europe
Hurling clubs in Europe
Sports teams in the Netherlands
Sports clubs in The Hague